Orthaga erebochlaena is a species of snout moth in the genus Orthaga. It is found on the island of Java.

The moth has a yellowish color and dark spots near the edges of its wings.

References

Moths described in 1938
Epipaschiinae
Endemic fauna of Indonesia